= Pishmana =

Neighborhood of the old Bulgarian capital Veliko Tarnovo

Coordinates: 42°13′N 25°47′E

Pishmana is a neighborhood of Veliko Tarnovo, the old capital of Bulgaria. It is located in the southeastern part of the city. It consists of 3 zones - A, B and C. Pishmana or 'Buzluja(the official name)' is the biggest neighborhood in Veliko Tarnovo. It was built in 1973, during the migration from the country to the city in the 60s and 70s. The housing project's buildings are home to more than 33,000 inhabitants of Veliko Tarnovo. It is a home of mostly middle-low-class families however in recent years infrastructure improved. It has two schools and a kindergarten. There is a retirement house and all the popular supermarkets have outlets there. Population as of 2010 is 33,000. The word 'pishamana' comes from the Turkish word 'pishman' something you regret doing. According to a legend, one Ottoman commander-in-chief said "I became pishman for coming to this hill'. To 'become pishman' means you really regret something.
